Barney Is My Darling is a British television sitcom that aired from 1965 to 1966 on BBC1. It starred Bill Fraser, Irene Handl, Angela Crow, and Pat Coombs. All six episodes are believed to be lost.

Episode list
17.12.65 - Home Is The Sailor (pilot) 
23.12.65 - The £2,000 A Year Man 
31.12.65 - The Twenty-Six Year Itch 
07.01.66 - Weddings, Funerals And Christenings 
14.01.66 - My Son! My Son! 
21.01.66 - The Prodigal Son

References

External links
Barney Is My Darling on IMDb

1965 British television series debuts
1966 British television series endings
Lost BBC episodes
Black-and-white British television shows
English-language television shows
1960s British sitcoms
BBC television sitcoms